is a fictional monster, or kaiju, that first appeared in the 1961 film Mothra, produced and distributed by Toho Studios. Mothra has appeared in several Toho tokusatsu films, most often as a recurring character in the Godzilla franchise. She is typically portrayed as a colossal sentient larva (caterpillar) or imago, accompanied by two miniature fairies speaking on her behalf. Unlike other Toho monsters, Mothra is a largely heroic character, having been variously portrayed as a protector of her own island culture, the Earth and Japan. Mothra's design is influenced by silk worms, their imagos, and those of giant silk moths in the family Saturniidae. The character is often depicted hatching offspring (in some cases, twins) when approaching death, a nod to the Saṃsāra doctrine of numerous Indian religions.

Mothra is one of Toho's most popular monsters and second only to Godzilla in her total number of film appearances. Polls taken during the early 1990s indicated that Mothra was particularly popular among women who were, at the time, the largest demographic among Japan's movie-going audience, a fact that prompted the filming of 1992's Godzilla vs. Mothra, which was the best-attended Toho film since King Kong vs. Godzilla. IGN listed Mothra as #3 on their "Top 10 Japanese Movie Monsters" list, while Complex listed the character as #7 on its "The 15 Most Badass Kaiju Monsters of All Time" list.

Though Mothra is generally portrayed as female, male individuals of her species have also been featured in the franchise, including Mothra Leo in the Rebirth of Mothra trilogy, and a male Mothra larva who appears alongside his non-identical twin in Godzilla: Tokyo S.O.S.

Overview

Name
The name  is the suffixation of "-ra" to the English word "moth"; since the Japanese language does not have dental fricatives, it is approximated "Mosura" in Japanese.

During its promotion of Mothra vs. Godzilla for the American market, American International Pictures entitled the movie Godzilla vs. the Thing, probably to avoid legal action from Columbia Pictures, which had released the original Mothra.

Development
Mothra was first conceived in the January 1961 serial The Luminous Fairies and Mothra by authors Shinichiro Nakamura, Takehiko Fukunaga and Yoshie Hotta, who had been commissioned by Toho to write the outline of a future film. The character was further developed by Shinichi Sekizawa, whose experiences of starving in the South Pacific islands during World War II prompted him to envision a movie featuring an island where mysterious events occurred.

In her 1961 debut, Mothra's adult form consisted of a wire-operated mechanical puppet, while the larva was a suitmation puppet operated by six stuntmen crawling in single file. In Mothra vs. Godzilla three years later, the adult Mothra puppet was modified with radio-controlled legs, while the larvae were portrayed via a combination of motor-driven props and hand puppets. The larval Mothra featured in Ghidorah, the Three-Headed Monster remained largely unchanged from its previous appearance, though the color of its eyes was changed from blue to red. The adult Mothra prop featured in Mothra vs. Godzilla was reused in Ebirah, Horror of the Deep, though previous heavy use had dulled its colors, frayed the fur on the head and damaged the wings.

During the early Heisei era of Godzilla films, which ignored the continuity established in pre-1984 movies, several attempts were made to develop a Mothra standalone feature. Akira Murao wrote a screenplay in 1990 entitled Mothra vs. Bagan, which revolved around a shape-shifting dragon called Bagan who sought to destroy humanity for its abuse of the Earth's resources, only to be defeated by Mothra, the god of peace. The screenplay was revised by Kazuki Ōmori after the release of Godzilla vs. Biollante, though the project was ultimately scrapped by Toho, due to the poor box office performance of Godzilla vs. Biollante, as well as the assumption that Mothra was a character born purely out of Japanese culture and thus would have been difficult to market overseas, unlike the more internationally recognized Godzilla. With the success of Godzilla vs. King Ghidorah, Toho sought to continue the series' newfound profitability by reintroducing familiar monsters rather than inventing new ones. Mothra was chosen as Godzilla's next antagonist on account of the character's popularity with women, who constituted the majority of cinemagoers at the time. Special effects head Koichi Kawakita co-wrote a screenplay entitled Godzilla vs. Gigamoth in 1991, which would have pitted Mothra against Godzilla and an irradiated Mothra doppelganger called Gigamoth, though this was rejected early on and replaced with the final plotline that was seen in the film Godzilla vs. Mothra. Kawakita's depiction of Mothra's adult form was given the ability to fire energy beams, which were rendered via optical effects, and the pollen dust emitted from its wings were given a sparkling effect not seen in prior movies. During the character's transformation from larva to adult, it was initially planned to have Mothra's unfolding wings rendered through CGI, though this was scrapped on account of it not looking "sensitive" enough. Although the movie was a financial success, the Mothra props were criticized by several authors, who noted that the adult Mothra's brighter colors made it look like a "plush toy" and that its wings flapped less gracefully than in previous incarnations, as they were made of heavy cloth. The Mothra puppet's immobile chicken-like feet and the lack of undulation in the larva prop's movements were also commented on as being inferior to the effects seen in 1960s Mothra movies. Criticism was also leveled at Mothra's altered origin story, which portrayed her as an extraterrestrial, thus dampening the character's motivation for protecting Earth. The character's newfound popularity nevertheless prompted Toho to produce Rebirth of Mothra in 1996.

For Godzilla, Mothra and King Ghidorah: Giant Monsters All-Out Attack, director Shūsuke Kaneko had originally planned on using Anguirus as one of Godzilla's antagonists, but was pressured by Toho chairman Isao Matsuoka to use the more recognizable and profitable Mothra, as the previous film in the franchise, Godzilla x Megaguirus, which featured an original and unfamiliar antagonist, was a box office and critical failure.

For 2003's Godzilla: Tokyo S.O.S., special effects director Eiichi Asada sought to model Mothra directly on her appearance in the original 1961 film and to keep optical effects to a minimum. As with Godzilla, Mothra and King Ghidorah, the adult Mothra was given mobile legs, though they were made to constantly move, as it was felt that the prop stopped looking realistic once they became immobile. Creature designer Shinichi Wakasa had initially wanted Mothra's wings to have the angular design seen in Rebirth of Mothra II, though the prop was ultimately given the wing shape seen in the 1960s movies. In addition, Mothra's twin larvae, one male and one female, were given nicknames by the staff on set - the male, who can be distinguished by his longer tusks and spikes, was nicknamed Taro, while the female was nicknamed Hanako.

Mothra's fairies

Mothra is usually accompanied by tiny twin female fairies, which Shinichi Sekizawa termed , meaning "little beauties". The original draft for Mothra called for four fairies, though Sekizawa reduced the number to two, as twins were comparatively rare in Japan, thus adding to the characters' mystique. Toho also sought to reinforce its links with Columbia Pictures, by featuring the singing duo the Peanuts, who had been popularized in America by Columbia Records. Yūji Koseki composed the song Mosura no uta ("Song of Mothra") for the fairies to sing when summoning Mothra. The song was originally sung in either the Malay or Indonesian language, but there is also a later version, set to the same tune, sung in Japanese:

The Peanuts were given an additional song in Ghidorah, the Three-Headed Monster entitled "Cry for Happiness", composed by Hiroshi Miyagawa. The Peanuts did not reprise their role in Ebirah, Horror of the Deep and were replaced by the singing duo Pair Bambi.

This casting move was criticized by Godzilla historian Steve Ryfle, who lamented the fact that the two actresses were not identical and that their singing voices were "paper thin." According to Takao Okawara, the Cosmos scenes were among the hardest scenes he had ever filmed, as the actresses had to synchronize their movements without looking at each other.

Moll and Lora contrast with prior adaptations because they possess separate personalities and rarely act in unison. Megumi Kobayashi was cast as Moll for all three films, Sayaka Yamaguchi as Lora for the first two films, Misato Tate as Lora for the third film and Aki Hano as Belvera for all three films.

Godzilla, Mothra and King Ghidorah: Giant Monsters All-Out Attack does not feature Mothra's fairies, but they are given a nod in the form of a pair of twin girls wearing white clothes during the scene where Mothra flies over Tokyo. They are played by sisters Ai and Aki Maeda.

In the anime trilogy directed by Gen Urobuchi, the fairies are human-sized sisters named Maina and Miana.

In Godzilla: King of the Monsters, it's revealed that Monarch researcher Dr. Ilene Chen (played by Zhang Ziyi) has an identical twin sister named Dr. Ling Chen, who is also in Monarch and is present at Mothra's hatching. The Chens are part of a family which appears to consist almost entirely of pairs of identical twin sisters, two of whom are shown visiting Infant Island (Mothra's traditional home) in 1961. The film's director and co-screenwriter, Michael Dougherty, confirmed the twins to be an updated version of the fairies, explaining, "It was important to me to find ways to modernize the ideas that [Mothra] has followers. Modernize the priestesses. [There] are still certain realms of believability to keep in take. You have to ease people into the more fantastical aspects." He noted that the twins were a "perfect example" of humans and monsters cooperating and forming a "symbiotic relationship with each other", saying, “The twins are an example of a very successful, long relationship...so I wanted to make sure that we found some way to incorporate them, even if it was a little bit of an Easter egg.” Dougherty, who is half-Vietnamese, felt the need to retain the twins' Asian ethnicity.

Character biography

Shōwa (1961–1968)

In the Showa continuity, Mothra is depicted as a mystical being that is worshiped by a primitive human culture native to Infant Island. Mothra has her hatching from an egg after her priestesses are abducted by a Rolisican capitalist hoping to exploit them as media celebrities. The larval Mothra swims to Tokyo and cocoons herself around the Tokyo Tower. Upon reaching her adult form, Mothra flies to Rolisica's capital and causes widespread destruction until her priestesses are returned to her.

Mothra in this era, most notably the first individual appeared in the 1961 film is the largest incarnation of all, being 180 meters in length with a wingspan of 250 meters and weighed 20,000 tonnes as an Imago, and 135 meters in body length and weighed 15,000 tonnes as a larva. In later films, the size of the Imagoes decreased to 53 meters in 1964 film and 40 meters in body length and 8,000 tonnes in weight in 1968 film respectively, while the size of the larva in 1966 film stayed the same to the 1961 individual.

In Mothra vs. Godzilla, a Mothra egg appears on the coast of Japan, and is exploited as a tourist attraction. Mothra's priestesses attempt to negotiate the return of the egg to Infant Island, but are rebuffed. Godzilla attacks Japan, forcing humanity to beseech an embittered Mothra to intervene. Mothra willingly sacrificed herself whilst fighting Godzilla, but the latter is defeated when two larvae emerge from the egg and encase Godzilla in a cocoon.

In Ghidorah, the Three-Headed Monster, it is revealed that only one of the larvae survived. The remaining larva attempts to convince Godzilla and Rodan to join forces with her in order to fight King Ghidorah, but the two monsters reject her proposal. Mothra is nearly killed attempting to fight Ghidorah alone, but is saved through the intervention of Godzilla and Rodan.

The larva ultimately gains adulthood in Ebirah, Horror of the Deep, where she saves a group of slaves taken from Infant Island from a terrorist base on Letchi Island undergoing a self-destruct sequence.

Another larva appears in Destroy All Monsters, living alongside other monsters in Monsterland. Along with the other monsters, Mothra is briefly enslaved by the Kilaaks, who force her to attack Beijing and later join Godzilla in the destruction of Tokyo. The Kilaaks' mind control is ultimately broken and Mothra joins the other monsters in the final battle against King Ghidorah. This was the character's final starring role in the Showa era, although Mothra would later be seen in stock footage from Ghidorah, the Three-Headed Monster and Destroy All Monsters for Godzilla vs. Gigan in 1972.

Heisei (1992–1998)
1992's Godzilla vs. Mothra portrays Mothra as a guardian of the Earth who presided over an advanced civilization over 12,000 years ago. When the civilization created a device designed to control the Earth's climate, the Earth responded by creating the Black Mothra, Battra – which Mothra defeated, but not before the civilization was wiped out. Mothra's egg is later discovered in 1992 on Infant Island by the Marutomo real estate agency, which seeks to exploit it and Mothra's priestesses for profit. The egg hatches during a fight between Godzilla and a resurrected Battra, and the larva later attacks Tokyo in order to save its priestesses. Mothra forms a cocoon around the National Diet Building, attains its adult form, then briefly fights Battra before joining forces with him in order to fight Godzilla. Battra dies in the attempt and Mothra pledges to fulfill her fallen comrade's role in preventing a meteorite from devastating the Earth in 1999.

In Godzilla vs. SpaceGodzilla, Mothra detected SpaceGodzilla's advance towards Earth and sends her priestesses to warn the planet of his arrival.

The Rebirth of Mothra trilogy is separate from the Godzilla Heisei continuity and portrays Mothra as the last remaining member of a species of giant moths who guard the Elias' civilization. This civilization was destroyed millions of years ago by the dragon Desghidorah, whom Mothra defeated. Mothra lays an egg in modern times, but is too weak to fight Desghidorah once it returns. The egg hatches and the new Mothra, a male larva named Mothra Leo, goes to protect his mother, but sadly Mothra is mortally wounded by Desghidorah while Leo is still too weak to injure the dragon. After Mothra dies, Leo metamorphoses into an adult, then manages to kill Desghidorah.

Leo returns in Rebirth of Mothra II, where he acquires a new and more powerful form in order to fight the pollution monster Dagahra.

In Rebirth of Mothra III, Leo is forced to travel backwards through time to the Cretaceous Period in order to retroactively kill the space dragon King Ghidorah. After seemingly defeating Ghidorah's younger form in the Cretaceous, Leo hibernates in a cocoon constructed by an ancestral Mothra species for 65 million years until the present day, where he defeats King Ghidorah's far stronger modern form with a new, equally strong form of his own.

Millennium (2001–2004)
In Godzilla, Mothra and King Ghidorah: Giant Monsters All-Out Attack, Mothra is portrayed as having been one of the three guardians of Yamato, originating 1,000 years before the events of the film. Initially an antagonist, Mothra was imprisoned in Lake Ikeda, only to be reawakened in 2001 to halt Godzilla's destruction of Tokyo. She is defeated, but transfers her spirit to King Ghidorah.

Godzilla: Tokyo S.O.S. has the Mothra from the original 1961 film send her priestesses to demand that Japan dismantle the anti-Godzilla weapon Kiryu or face destruction, as she considers the cyborg to be against the natural order, having been created using the bones of the first Godzilla. When the second Godzilla lands, Mothra attempts to fight the monster alongside Kiryu, but is killed in the process. Two larvae hatch on Infant Island and reach Tokyo in order to fight Godzilla, whom they encase in a cocoon, which is then transported into the ocean by Kiryu.

Godzilla: Final Wars, which ignores the continuity of the previous film, establishes that Mothra protected the Earth 10,000 years ago from the cyborg Gigan. In the distant future, Gigan returns, under the control of the Xiliens, and is confronted by Mothra. In the ensuing battle, Mothra catches fire, but manages to kill Gigan by ramming into it and exploding. However, in a mid-credits scene, Mothra is shown to be alive after all and flying back to Infant Island to be reunited with the Shobijin.

Reiwa era (2016–present)
In the anime trilogy, while Mothra never made a physical appearance, she was mentioned in Godzilla: City on the Edge of Battle to have been killed by Godzilla years prior, though her egg ended up in the protection of the Houtua people, a species of evolved humans who adapted Mothra-like features to survive the now Godzilla ruled Earth. An astral projection of Mothra's unborn child in their adult form appears in Godzilla: The Planet Eater.

In Godzilla Singular Point, dozens of small moths, that bear a striking resemblance to Mothra, appear in the final episodes of the Godzilla animated television series Godzilla: Singular Point.  (Visual similarities include: blue eyes, orange and yellow patterns on the wings, a 'false eye' pattern as seen on Mothra as well as other species of Lepidoptera). These small moths even seem to shed their golden scales, similar to how Mothra has done the same thing in the past. These moths also have a brief interaction with Jet Jaguar, making it the first on-screen interaction between the two Toho characters (outside of comics, video games, spin-offs, etc.).

However, due to this show's nature to rename / rebrand existing monsters as new ones (For example: A creature that heavily resembles “Varan”, both in its visual design & its sound design, is later revealed to be a different creature), we do not have any direct confirmation that this is actually Mothra. One may assume these moths are related to Mothra in some way (or actually are several Mothras), but the show does not provide any context as to what they actually are.

Several of Mothra's previous incarnations make cameo appearances in the show's ending credits (alongside several other Toho properties).

MonsterVerse (2019–present)

In 2014, Legendary Pictures announced that they had acquired the rights to Rodan, Mothra and King Ghidorah from Toho to use in their MonsterVerse.

In the post-credits scene at the end of the 2017 film Kong: Skull Island, Mothra appears in a series of cave paintings depicting other monsters that are known to exist that are shown in the footage to James Conrad and Mason Weaver, along with Godzilla, Rodan and King Ghidorah.

A casting call confirmed that Rodan, Mothra, and King Ghidorah would all be featured in Godzilla: King of the Monsters. Viral marketing for the movie showed that Mothra retained her status as a creature who is deified as an angelic-like goddess, referred to as the Queen of the Monsters. Monarch Sciences, the film's promotional website, identifies the Yunnan rainforest as Mothra's location (however, Infant Island was referenced within the film, and the name "Mosura" is said to be derived from a small Indonesian island) and states in its adult form to be capable of emitting beta-wave bioluminescence that can be projected through the intricate patterns on its wings and weaponized into destructive and blinding ‘god rays’. Further promotional material also revealed narrower wings, a wider wingspan (at 803 feet or 244.75 meters, it is second only to her original 250-meter wingspan), long praying mantis-like forearms and legs as opposed to bird-like limbs and a body design that is more reminiscent of real-life moths, with a smaller body and head. The markings on her wings are said to mark her as the "Queen of the Monsters" and that they apparently link Mothra to Godzilla, the King of the Monsters, since the eye spots on her wings are modeled after Godzilla's eyes. Within the film, she is shown to have a symbiotic relationship with Godzilla, and temporarily paralyzes Rodan with a hidden abdominal stinger. These changes make Mothra the most heavily redesigned monster in the series.

Mothra first appears hatching from her egg in her larval state and is calmed by Dr. Emma Russell using the ORCA bio-acoustics device, becoming docile. When eco-terrorists led by Colonel Alan Jonah arrive soon after and capture Russell, her daughter Madison and the ORCA device, Mothra retreats under a waterfall and cocoons herself, later emerging from her cocoon in her adult form and flying off. During the fight in Boston, Mothra defeats Rodan and is disintegrated by King Ghidorah while protecting a fallen Godzilla. Her power is transferred to Godzilla as a result via her ashes, preventing him from suffering a nuclear meltdown and allowing him to defeat Ghidorah by achieving his burning form. During the credits, a news program speculates about the existence of a second Mothra egg, which the director later confirmed.

Appearances

Films
 Mothra (1961)
 Mothra vs. Godzilla (1964)
 Ghidorah, the Three-Headed Monster (1964)
 Ebirah, Horror of the Deep (1966)
 Destroy All Monsters (1968)
 Godzilla vs. Mothra (1992)
 Godzilla vs. SpaceGodzilla (1994)
 Rebirth of Mothra (1996) – as Mothra Leo
 Rebirth of Mothra II (1997) – as Mothra Leo
 Rebirth of Mothra III (1998) – as Mothra Leo
 Godzilla, Mothra and King Ghidorah: Giant Monsters All-Out Attack (2001)
 Godzilla: Tokyo S.O.S. (2003)
 Godzilla: Final Wars (2004)
 Kaiju Bunraku (2017)
 Godzilla: The Planet Eater (2018)
 Godzilla: King of the Monsters (2019)

Television
 Godzilla Island (1997–1998)
 The Simpsons (1989–present)
 Sonic X (2003–2005)

Video games
 Godzilla: Monster of Monsters (NES – 1988)
 Godzilla 2: War of the Monsters (NES – 1991)
 Kaijū-ō Godzilla / King of the Monsters, Godzilla (Game Boy – 1993)
 Godzilla: Monster War / Godzilla: Destroy All Monsters (Super Famicom – 1994)
 Godzilla Giant Monster March (Game Gear – 1995)
 Godzilla Trading Battle (PlayStation – 1998)
 Godzilla Generations: Maximum Impact (Dreamcast – 1999)
 Godzilla: Destroy All Monsters Melee (GCN, Xbox – 2002/2003)
 Godzilla: Domination! (GBA – 2002)
 Godzilla: Save the Earth (Xbox, PS2 – 2004)
 World of Warcraft (Windows – 2004) (reference) 
 Godzilla: Unleashed (Wii – 2007)
 Godzilla Unleashed: Double Smash (NDS – 2007)
 Godzilla: Unleashed (PS2 – 2007)
Terraria (Windows – 2012) (reference)
 Godzilla: The Game (PS3 – 2014 PS3 PS4 – 2015)
 City Shrouded in Shadow (PS4 – 2017)
 Godzilla Defense Force (2019)

Literature
 The Luminous Fairies and Mothra (serialized novel) (1961)
 Godzilla 2000 (1996)
 Godzilla at World's End (1998)
 Godzilla: Kingdom of Monsters (comic – 2011–2012)
 Godzilla: Gangsters and Goliaths (comic – 2011)
 Godzilla: Legends (comic – 2011–2012)
 Godzilla (comic – 2012)
 Godzilla: The Half-Century War (comic – 2012–2013)
 Godzilla: Rulers of Earth (comic – 2013–2015)
 Godzilla: Cataclysm (comic – 2014)
 Godzilla: Oblivion (comic – 2016)
 Godzilla: Rage Across Time (comic – 2016)
 Godzilla: Project Mechagodzilla (novel – 2018)
 Godzilla Rivals (comic - 2021)

Music 
 Mothra of Anvil (Metal on Metal, 1982)
 'Mothra', song by Atomship (The Crash of '47, 2004)
 'Mothra', song by Godflesh

Collectible Card Game 

 Luminous Broodmoth (Mothra, Supersonic Queen)

References

Sources
 
 
 

 
Female characters in film
Fictional butterflies and moths
Fictional characters who can move at superhuman speeds
Fictional characters with superhuman strength
Fictional goddesses
Fictional monsters
Fictional suicides
Film characters introduced in 1961
Godzilla characters
Kaiju
Mothra characters
Toho monsters